The Suburban Baths (Italian Terme Suburbane) are a building in Pompeii, Italy, a town in the Italian region of Campania that was buried by the eruption of Mount Vesuvius in 79 AD, which consequently preserved it.

The Suburban Baths were publicly owned, as were also the Stabian, Forum, and Central baths in the city. They were built in the early empire, possibly under the Emperor Tiberius (14–37 AD), much later than the others and thus were built outside the city walls near the Porta Marina, one of the city gates. By this time, land was more easily available outside the city as the walls had lost their defensive role after the town became a Roman colony.

The baths also benefitted from the increased supply of running water after the connection of the city to the Aqua Augusta aqueduct in 30–20 BC.

The bathhouse was renovated after the earthquake of 62 AD, when a piscina calida, a heated swimming pool, was added to the north of the complex.

The baths were discovered in 1958, much later than the rest of the city, though a systematic excavation had to wait until 1985–1987.

Although publicly owned, these baths seem to have been reserved for a private clientele unlike the other public baths.

The building is notable for its surviving erotic wall paintings, the only set of such art found in a public Roman bath house.

Structure 

The building was a two-storey structure: the upper floor, as in the Palaestra/Sarno baths, was divided into three apartments for rent, with views towards the port and the Bay of Naples through the large glass windows. These rooms may also have provided space for the selling of sexual services. This upper floor was either accessed by a staircase from the floor below or via a door on the Via Marina.

The baths were built to a higher standard of luxury and thermal effectiveness than the earlier baths in the town and have many hallmarks of the "newer" bath architecture of the first century AD: "single-axis row" type (with rooms in a linear increasingly warm arrangement promoting a particular route through the baths and bordering a palaestra), large windows facing southwest, and an outdoor pool with a fountain.

Construction was first limited to the apodyterium (dressing room), frigidarium (cold room), tepidarium (warm room), laconicum (hot dry room) and caldarium (hot room); the natatio was added later as three rooms, including a nymphaeum with a water cascade, providing an alternative route to the existing one of the tepidarium followed by the caldarium. The entrance to the bathhouse is through a long corridor that leads into the apodyterium. The bathers would also have had access to a latrine, seating between six and eight people.

The piscina calida (hot pool) used an innovative heating system called a samovar, a domed metal plate  which was part of the pool floor above the furnace to heat the pool water directly.

Only one apodyterium has led to speculation by archaeologists that both men and women shared this facility, or that it was male-only or time-shared. The apodyterium contains the erotic wall paintings.

Erotic art in the Suburban Baths 

The erotic wall paintings in the Suburban Baths are the only set of such art found in a public Roman bath house. Explicit sex scenes (such as group sex and oral sex) are depicted in these paintings that cannot be easily found in collections of erotic Roman art. As the sexual acts portrayed are all considered "debased" according to the customs of ancient Rome, it is possible that the intention behind their reproduction was to provide a source of humour to visitors of the building. The paintings are in the apodyterium and each scene is above a numbered box. These boxes are thought to have functioned as lockers in which bathers put their clothes. It is speculated that the paintings possibly served as way for the bathers to remember the location of their box (in lieu of numbering). The presence of these paintings in a public bathhouse shared by men and women gives some insight into Roman culture and suggests that people would not have found this offensive, and possibly humorous.

The images are as follows:
 two images showing generic male-female coital scenes
 woman performing fellatio on a man
 man performing cunnilingus on a woman
 one lesbian duo with a phallus-shaped sexual aid or dildo
 one threesome
 one foursome
 naked man with deformed, huge testicles

See also

Erotic art in Pompeii and Herculaneum
Homosexuality in ancient Rome
Sexuality in ancient Rome

Notes

References 
 Berry, J. (2007) The Complete Pompeii, London: Thames & Hudson Ltd. 
 Fagan, G. G. (1999) Bathing in Public in the Roman World, United States of America: The University of Michigan Press. 
 Garret G. Fagan, "The Genesis of the Roman Public Bath: Recent Approaches and Future Directions", American Journal of Archaeology, Vol. 105, No. 3. (July 2001), pp. 403–426.
 Jacobelli (1995). Le pitture erotiche delle Terme Suburbane di Pompei. Rome: 'L'Erma' di Bretschneider. . (See review by John R. Clarke's in: The American Journal of Archaeology, Vol. 100, No. 2 (April 1996), pp. 431–432.)
 Koloski-Ostrow, A. O. (2007) ‘The city baths of Pompeii and Herculaneum’, in The World of Pompeii, ed. by J. J. Dobbins and P. W. Foss (Abingdon: Routledge), pp. 224–256. 
 Roger Ling, Review: "Le pitture erotiche delle Terma Suburbane de Pompeii" by L. Jacobelli, The Classical Review, New Ser., Vol. 46, No. 2 (1996), pp. 390–391.
 Ling, R. (2011) Pompeii: History, Life and Afterlife, Stroud: The History Press. 
 Manderscheid, H. (2000) ‘The Water Management of Greek and Roman Baths’, in Handbook of Ancient Water Technology, ed. by O. Wikander (Leiden: Brill), pp. 467–538. 
 Inge Nielsen (1990). The Architecture and Cultural History of Roman Public Baths, Aarhus University Press. 
 Roy Bowen Ward, "Women in Roman Baths", The Harvard Theological Review, Vol. 85, No. 2. (April 1992), pp. 125–147.

Pompeii (ancient city)
Ancient Roman baths in Italy